The Women's 50m Freestyle competition of the 2014 FINA World Swimming Championships (25 m) was held on 6 December with the heats and the semifinals and 7 December with the final.

Records
Prior to the competition, the existing world and championship records were as follows.

Results

Heats
The heats were held at 10:37.

Semifinals
The semifinals were held at 18:44.

Semifinal 1

Semifinal 2

Final
The final was held at 19:13.

References

Women's 50 metre freestyle
2014 in women's swimming